Operation Romeo is a 2022 Indian Hindi-language romantic thriller film directed by Shashant Shah. It is an official remake of 2019 Malayalam film Ishq. This film is produced by Shital Bhatia and Neeraj Pandey under the banner of Friday Filmworks and Plan C Studios, the film stars Sidhant Gupta and Vedika Pinto. The supporting cast includes Sharad Kelkar, Bhumika Chawla and Kishor Kadam.

Cast 
 Sidhant Gupta as Aditya Sharma
 Vedika Pinto as Neha Kasliwal
 Bhumika Chawla as Chhaya
 Sharad Kelkar as Mangesh Jadhav
 Kishor Kadam as Patil
 Neha Khan as Aditya's Sister

Production

Development 
The film was announced in 2021, a remake of the 2019 Malayalam film Ishq.

Soundtrack 
The film's music composed by M. M. Keeravani while lyrics written by Manoj Muntashir. On 5 April 2022, the first song titled 'Abhi Abhi' sung by Neeti Mohan was unveiled. Six days later, the second song 'Tere Bin Jeena Kya' sung by Vishal Mishra and Rupali Jagga was released.

Marketing 
A motion poster of the film featuring the cast was released on 31 March 2022. The film was released on 22 April 2022.

Release

Theatrical
The film was released in theatres on 22 April 2022.

Home media
The digital streaming rights of the film is owned by Netflix. The film was streamed on Netflix from 3 July 2022.

Reception

Critical reception  
BH Harsh of Firstpost gave the film a rating of three and a half stars out of five and wrote "Its ability to charter the uncomfortable lanes is its biggest strength which lies in the themes of justice and morality". Rohit Bhatnagar of The Free Press Journal gave the film a rating of three and a half stars and wrote "New kids on the block, Sidhant and Vedika, are the film's highlight.Sharad Kelkar as a ruthless cop in disguise, delivers an earnest performance". Rachana Dubey of The Times of India gave it two and a half stars out of five and found that "a thriller-love story have been built well but the film eventually takes a completely different turn and it doesn't stitch well at the end." Deepa Gahlot of Rediff.com gave the film two and a half stars out of five and observed, "the film is scarily effective in a 'but for the grace of God's way'," but criticized the performances as disappointing "because it did have something significant to say and chickened out".

References

External links